The Stadium Tour was a co-headlining concert tour by British rock band Def Leppard and American rock band Mötley Crüe, taking place in the summer and fall of 2022 in venues across North America. Poison and Joan Jett & the Blackhearts served as the tour's special guests, while Classless Act was the opening band. It was Mötley Crüe's first major tour in seven years (following their final world tour in 2014–2015), and Def Leppard's first in three years, with the latter touring in support of their twelfth studio album Diamond Star Halos.

The Stadium Tour was announced on December 4, 2019, and was set to take place in the summer of 2020. It was later announced that the tour would be rescheduled for 2021 due to the COVID-19 pandemic. The tour was once again pushed back to 2022 due to the same circumstances. The tour began on June 16, 2022 in Atlanta, Georgia and concluded on September 9, 2022 in Las Vegas, Nevada. The members of Def Leppard indicated that a European version of The Stadium Tour would take place in 2023. Tour dates for the Latin American and European tour were later announced on October 20, 2022; this tour was advertised as The World Tour and will once again be a co-headlining tour of Def Leppard and Mötley Crüe.

Support acts

Special guests 
 Poison
 Joan Jett & the Blackhearts

Opening act 
 Classless Act

Setlists

Tour dates

Personnel
Def Leppard
Rick Savage – bass, backing vocals
Joe Elliott – lead vocals, occasional acoustic guitar
Rick Allen – drums, percussion
Phil Collen – guitar, backing vocals
Vivian Campbell – guitar, backing vocals

Mötley Crüe
Nikki Sixx – bass, piano, backing vocals
Vince Neil – lead vocals
Tommy Lee – drums, piano, backing vocals
Mick Mars – guitar, backing vocals
Additional personnel:
Tommy Clufetos – drums
"Nasty Habits":
Laura "Lolo" D'Anzieri – backing vocals, dancer
Bailey Swift – backing vocals, dancer
Hannah Sutton – backing vocals, dancer

References

Notes

Citations

2022 concert tours
Co-headlining concert tours
Def Leppard concert tours
Mötley Crüe concert tours
Reunion concert tours
Concert tours postponed due to the COVID-19 pandemic